Peter Watson Middleton (13 September 1948 – April 1977) was an English professional footballer who played as a midfielder. He spent almost all of his career with Bradford City. His career was cut short following an accident just days after his Plymouth Argyle debut.

He was one of eight children, including four boys, born in Rawmarsh, Yorkshire, England. One of his brothers, John, also played for Bradford City.

He was found dead in his car in 1977.

Career
Middleton was a schoolboy with Sheffield Wednesday who signed as an apprentice professional. He became a regular in the reserves, signing as a full-time player in 1965. But after three years without a first team game he moved to Bradford City.

Bradford City paid £500 for him. He played for four full seasons at Bradford City and into the start of 1972–1973 season, scoring 25 goals in 131 league appearances. He also had a good scoring record in the FA Cup and League Cup, with three goals in the former and six in the latter in a total of 20 cup games.

In September 1972 he left Valley Parade to join Plymouth Argyle. He scored on his debut against Shrewsbury Town but it proved to be his last first-team appearance. A few days later he was struck by a car as he crossed a road. He tried to resurrect his career even scoring twice in a reserve game, but he quit following advice from a specialist. He had a benefit game against Manchester United.

In April 1977 he was found dead in his car.

References

1948 births
1977 deaths
People from Rawmarsh
Footballers from South Yorkshire
English footballers
Association football midfielders
English Football League players
Sheffield Wednesday F.C. players
Bradford City A.F.C. players
Plymouth Argyle F.C. players